Navajo is a census-designated place (CDP) on the Navajo Nation in McKinley County, New Mexico, United States. The population was 2,097 at the 2000 census. Navajo is the most Navajo town in the United States, with 95.04% of residents having full or partial Navajo ancestry.

Geography
Navajo is located at  (35.905617, -109.028733).

To the east of Navajo is Assayi Lake, and just north of Navajo is Red Lake, Wheatfields Lake, and Tsaile Lake. There is an old existing strata volcano, Fuzzy Mountain, which in the winter gives radial sources of water to the environment. The area is rich with culture and traditions. Many of the water resources around Navajo leave the evidence of rushing streams and washes. The evergreen trees offer shading to many of the animals in the summer and provide shelter in the winter. Navajo had employed many Navajos at the sawmill, N.F.P.I. (Navajo Forest Products Industry). The mill has since gone out of business and left Navajo to struggle in the economic development. Many of the people left the Navajo area to relocate to places that had jobs readily available. Today the mill stands alone and empty. Still, Navajo exists because of the schools, the hometown market, the gas station, and the homes.

Demographics

At the 2000 census there were 2,097 people, 475 households, and 406 families in the CDP. The population density was 928.1 people per square mile (358.3/km). There were 560 housing units at an average density of 247.8 per square mile (95.7/km).  The racial makeup of the CDP was 96.42% Native American, 2.86% White, 0.48% from two or more races, and 0.24% from other races. Hispanic or Latino of any race were 0.62%.

Of the 475 households 68.0% had children under the age of 18 living with them, 40.6% were married couples living together, 37.7% had a female householder with no husband present, and 14.5% were non-families. 12.8% of households were one person and 0.8% were one person aged 65 or older. The average household size was 4.41 and the average family size was 4.81.

The age distribution was 51.9% under the age of 18, 9.4% from 18 to 24, 26.1% from 25 to 44, 10.5% from 45 to 64, and 2.0% 65 or older. The median age was 17 years. For every 100 females, there were 88.2 males. For every 100 females age 18 and over, there were 78.4 males.

The median household income was $14,688 and the median family income  was $12,569. Males had a median income of $21,518 versus $24,083 for females. The per capita income for the CDP was $4,551. About 64.0% of families and 67.4% of the population were below the poverty line, including 76.0% of those under age 18 and 63.9% of those age 65 or over.

Education
It is in Gallup-McKinley County Public Schools.

The Bureau of Indian Education (BIE) operates Crystal Boarding School, a K-6 boarding school, in Crystal (it has a Navajo address).

See also

 List of census-designated places in New Mexico

References

External links

Census-designated places in McKinley County, New Mexico
Census-designated places in New Mexico
Populated places on the Navajo Nation